Tetrachloroaluminate [AlCl4]− is an anion formed from aluminium and chlorine. The anion has a tetrahedral shape, similar to carbon tetrachloride where carbon is replaced with aluminium. Some tetrachloroaluminates are soluble in organic solvents, creating an ionic non-aqueous solution, making them suitable as component of electrolytes for batteries. For example, lithium tetrachloroaluminate is used in some lithium batteries.

Formation 
Tetrachloroaluminate ions are formed as intermediates in the Friedel–Crafts reactions when aluminium chloride is used as the catalyst. In the case of the Friedel–Crafts alkylation, the reaction can be broken into three steps as follows:

Step 1: The alkyl halide reacts with the strong Lewis acid to form an activated electrophile composed of the tetrachloroaluminate ion and the alkyl group.

Step 2: The aromatic ring (benzene in this case) reacts with the activated electrophile forming an alkylbenzenium carbocation.

Step 3: The alkylbenzenium carbocation reacts with a tetrachloroaluminate anion, regenerating the aromatic ring and the Lewis acid and forming hydrochloric acid (HCl).

A similar mechanism occurs in the Friedel–Crafts acylation.

References 

 
Non-coordinating anions